Ombyte av tåg (Change of Train) is a 1943 Swedish drama film directed by Hasse Ekman.

Plot
Inga Dahl, an unemployed actress, and Joakim Lundell is a couple from times past, many years later by chance they happen to meet on a train station. They drink a cup of coffee together and in flashbacks we get to follow their love sagas beginning and end.

Cast 
Sonja Wigert as Inga Dahl 
Hasse Ekman as Joakim "Kim" Lundell 
Georg Rydeberg as Leo Waller, actor
Karin Kavli as Vera, actress
Georg Funkquist as Hugo Linde, Theatre manager
Ludde Gentzel as Anderson, Theatre doorman 
Torsten Hillberg as herr Lundell, Kims father 
Gull Natorp as Rut Lundell, Kims mother
Barbro Flodquist as Ebba, actress
Gabriel Alw as doctor 
Anna-Stina Wåglund as Waitress at the Railway station
Gösta Bodin as Angry Visitor at the Theatre 
Agda Helin as Angry Man's Wife
Willy Peters as Rehearsing Actor 
Astrid Bodin as Waitress at the Railway station
Märta Torén as Young Woman in the Audience

External links 

1943 films
Films directed by Hasse Ekman
1940s Swedish-language films
Swedish drama films
Swedish black-and-white films
1943 drama films
1940s Swedish films